Philip of Dreux (Philippe de Dreux; 1158–1217) was a French nobleman, Bishop of Beauvais, and figure of the Third Crusade.

He was an active soldier, an ally in the field of Philip Augustus, the French king and his cousin, making him an opponent in campaigns in France and elsewhere of Richard I of England. He was in also in demand as a priest, to make and break marriages. He presided over that of Conrad of Montferrat at the siege of Acre, marrying him to Isabella I of Jerusalem, daughter of Amalric I, whose marriage he annulled. He was also party to the annulment of the marriage between Philip Augustus and Ingeborg of Denmark.

Life
Philip was son of Robert I of Dreux and Agnes of Baudemont, and the brother of Robert II of Dreux.

He first campaigned in Palestine in 1180, in an expedition headed by Henry II of Champagne and Peter I of Courtenay. This attack on Saladin's holdings was ineffectual.

Robert II and Philip of Dreux arrived with forces in Palestine in 1189.

Richard Lionheart bore him a consistent enmity after the Crusade; Philip of Dreux had been one of those relaying the rumour that Richard was responsible for the killing of Conrad of Montferrat. Subsequently Philip had gone to Germany, when Richard was imprisoned, to advocate against setting him free. There, Philip encouraged Richard's captors to treat him poorly, earning the lifelong hatred of Richard, who considered him "a robber and an incendiary".

He was captured by Angevin forces under the mercenary leader Mercadier and Prince John in a Normandy campaign, in 1197. Richard was still refusing to release him a year later, and again early in 1199. When Peter of Capua (who was trying to enlist Richard for the Fourth Crusade) insisted that Richard release Philip, Richard exploded and threatened to castrate Peter, so intense was his hatred of his prisoner Philip. Pope Celestine III was unsympathetic to Philip, confined at Rouen and then, after an escape attempt, at Chinon. He was freed only after Richard’s death in 1199, with Richard's successor, John agreeing to exchange him for the captured bishop-elect of Cambrai in 1200.

In 1210 he was in action against the Cathars in southern France, with Renaud de Mouçon, bishop of Chartres, in support of Simon de Montfort.

He drew support from Philip Augustus in his conflict against Renaud de Dammartin, leading to Renaud's 1212 alliance with John. Philip was later a combatant on the victorious French side in 1214 at the Battle of Bouvines. He took a mace to William Longsword, Earl of Salisbury, at an important moment in the battle, leading to the Earl’s capture.

In his last year as bishop he founded the Pentemont Abbey, a Cistercian convent whose later buildings in Paris remain to the present day.

References

Sources

External links

1158 births
1217 deaths
Bishops of Beauvais
House of Dreux
Christians of the Third Crusade
12th-century French Roman Catholic bishops
13th-century French Roman Catholic bishops
13th-century peers of France